Valley of the Lawless is a 1936 American Western film directed by Robert North Bradbury and written by Charles F. Royal. The film stars Johnny Mack Brown, Joyce Compton, George "Gabby" Hayes, Frank Hagney, Dennis Moore and Bobby Nelson. The film was released on January 25, 1936, by Supreme Pictures.

Plot

Cast           
Johnny Mack Brown as Bruce Reynolds
Joyce Compton as Joan Jenkins
George "Gabby" Hayes as Grandpaw Jenkins 
Frank Hagney as Garlow
Dennis Moore as Cliff Grey 
Bobby Nelson as Billy Jenkins
Charles King as Regan
Jack Rockwell as Sheriff Grey
Frank Ball as Amos Jenkins

References

External links
 

1936 films
1930s English-language films
American Western (genre) films
1936 Western (genre) films
Films directed by Robert N. Bradbury
American black-and-white films
1930s American films